The 1981 Individual Long Track World Championship was the 11th edition of the FIM speedway Individual Long Track World Championship. The event was held on 20 September 1981 in Gornja Radgona in the Slovenia, which was Yugoslavia at the time.

The world title was won by Michael Lee of England. Ivan Mauger crashed in heat 7 and was taken to hospital.

Final Classification 

 E = eliminated (no further ride)
 f = fell
 ef = engine failure
 ns = non starter

References 

1981
International sports competitions hosted by Yugoslavia
Motor
Motor